Erik Vellan is a Norwegian handball player.

He made his debut on the Norwegian national team in 1956, 
and played 29 matches for the national team between 1956 and 1965. He participated at the 1958 World Men's Handball Championship.

References

Year of birth missing (living people)
Living people
Norwegian male handball players